LBMS may refer to:
 La Belle Montessori School, Silang, Cavite, Philippines
 Live Broadcast and Media Solutions, A broadcast solutions providing vendor.
 Laboratory for Bioregenerative Medicine and Surgery, a medical research laboratory at Weill Cornell Medical College, New York, New York, United States
 Lake Bluff Middle School, Lake Bluff, Illinois, United States
 Liberty Bowl Memorial Stadium, a football stadium in Memphis, Tennessee, United States

See also 
 LBM (disambiguation)